Bayan-Uul is the name of two sums (districts) in Mongolia:
 Bayan-Uul, Dornod
 Bayan-Uul, Govi-Altai